Šumadija–Vojvodina dialect (Serbo-Croatian: Latin: Šumadijsko-vojvođanski dijalekat, Cyrillic: Шумадијско-војвођански дијалекат) is a dialect of Shtokavian / Serbo-Croatian. It is a base for Ekavian Standard Serbian.

Distribution
The dialect is mainly spoken in Serbia or more exactly in most of the province of Vojvodina, as well as in Belgrade, Mačva, Šumadija,  and western Serbia. Some of the speakers could be also found in neighboring areas of Romania, Croatia and Hungary.

History
In the 16th century, the dialect was spoken in entire Vojvodina, as well as in some parts of present-day Hungary and Romania. During the Great Serb Migration from 1690, many speakers of the dialect were settled in the Budapest region. Most of these settlers were later assimilated. During the 18th and 19th century, the territorial distribution of the dialect was reduced due to the migrations of speakers of Hungarian language from the north and speakers of Romanian language from the east.

Linguistic standard
Šumadija–Vojvodina dialect is a base for the standard Ekavian version of the Serbian literary language. It was also a base for the Serbian literary language in the 18th and 19th century, before the linguistic reform was introduced by Vuk Karadžić. During the reform, the standard variety of the dialect was adapted to be more similar to Ijekavian dialect.

References

External links
Narečja i dijalekti srpskog jezika / Dialects of the Serbian language (in Serbian)
About Šumadija–Vojvodina dialect (in Serbian)
Map showing the distribution of the dialect
Map showing the distribution of the dialect
Map showing the distribution of the dialect
Map showing the distribution of the dialect
Map showing the distribution of the dialect

Serbo-Croatian language
Dialects by location
Serbian dialects